Headliners (UK) is a United Kingdom of Great Britain and Northern Ireland (UK) charity that provides a programme of learning through journalism for young people aged 8–19. Headliners believe young people have the right to be heard and empower them to express themselves, tell their stories  and change their lives. 

Initially Headliners was founded as Children's Express in 1994, the charity was based on the international youth news agency Children's Express.

After Children's Express ceased operations in 2001, the UK charity was relaunched as Headliners on 30 January 2007.

Headliners has projects based in London, Belfast, Foyle (Derry), and Newcastle upon Tyne. 

They did have offices in the South-East of England, West Midlands and Yorkshire, however later closed.

It was awarded a £900,000 Big Lottery Fund grant in December 2006, and a £299,000 V grant in December 2007.

Work 
Headliners have ran large number of different programs working with young people aged between 12 to 25 year olds.

Headliners has had work shown on the BBC, Sky, Channel 4, ITV, as well as featured in The Guardian, The Times, The Independent and The Mirror.

In the Summer of 2007, Headliners worked with the BBC in Northern Ireland on a range of stories involving young people in the province.

Headliners worked with Choice FM as part of the Peace on the Streets campaign in London.

Headliners are running a wide range of programs such as the National Citizen Service, Voices for Change, Digital Citizen, Leadership Programmes, Care Leaders, and Grime City.

In 2017 Headliners worked young people who managed to complete over 30,000 volunteering hours.

References

External links 
 Headliners website

Journalism schools in the United Kingdom